The House of Klinkowström or Klinckowström is an old Prussian noble house whose members played prominent roles in the history of Prussia, Sweden and Austria.

History
The family first appeared in the documents from 1320 found in St. Nicholas Church, Prenzlau, where brothers Peter und Johann de Klinkow were mentioned as it citizens and Burglehn holders. Members of the family that served in Sweden were first raised to hereditary nobility in the second half of the 17th century by King Charles XI, while on 8 January 1759 they received the title of Baron from King Adolf Frederick. Some of their descendants who relocated to Prussia were given the title of Count by King Frederick William III on 17 July 1798 . The family had several lines: noble, baronial and countly line.

Notable members
 Hedvig Eleonora von Klinckowström, née von Fersen (1753–1792)
 Friedrich August von Klinkowström (1778–1835), a German artist, author and teacher
 Joseph von Klinkowström (1813–1876), an Austrian Jesuit missionary; son of Friedrich August

Low German surnames
Pomeranian nobility
Swedish nobility
Swedish people of German descent
Prussian nobility
Austrian noble families
Austrian people of German descent